Lorenzo Pilat (born  24 June 1938), also known as Pilade, is an Italian singer-songwriter and composer, mainly active between the second half of the 1960s and the 1970s.

Life and career 
Born in Trieste,  Pilat started his career performing in clubs of his hometown. In 1963 he entered the Clan Celentano label, making his record debut with "Ciao ragazzi ciao". His main hits were "Shenandoah" (a cover of traditional song "The Legend of Shenandoah") and "La legge del menga". In the 1970s Pilat focused his activities on composing song for other artists, often collaborating with Daniele Pace and Mario Panzeri; among the best known songs he penned, were Tom Jones' "Love Me Tonight", Adriano Celentano's "L'attore", Gigliola Cinquetti's "Sì" and "Alle porte del sole", Gianni Nazzaro's "Quanto è bella lei" and Orietta Berti's "Non illuderti mai" and "Finchè la barca va". As a singer, starting from the 1970s he specialized in revisiting traditional triestine songs.

Discography
Album    
 1973: Trieste matta (CBS, 65477)
     1975: La mula (CBS)
     1978: Io, Trieste (Poor Cow, LTS 040)
     1981: Trieste mia (CGD)
   2000: Ghost (Poor Cow)
   2000: Pilade (DV More Record)
   2000: Riccio di mare (Ed. Digital sound)
   2002: La cavala zelante - Canzoni triestine n. 1 (Poor Cow)
   2002: Torno a Trieste - Canzoni triestine n. 2 (Poor Cow)
   2002: Trieste piena de mar - Canzoni triestine n. 3 (Poor Cow)
   2002: Viva la bora - Canzoni triestine n. 4 (Poor Cow)
   2005: Cuore da bambino (Poor Cow)
   2006: Come te pol dimenticarte de Trieste - Canzoni triestine n. 5 (Poor Cow)
   2006: Sussurrando melodie d'amore (Poor Cow)
   2006: C'era una volta il Clan (Green/Duck Record)
   2007: Canto le mie canzoni...! (Poor Cow)
   2007: I famosi del Clan (Poor Cow)
   2011: Voio far el sindaco (Poor Cow)

References

External links  
 
 

People from Trieste
1938 births
Living people
Italian male singer-songwriters
Italian male composers